Dibakar Patnaik was an Indian politician. He was a Member of Parliament, representing Odisha in the Rajya Sabha the upper house of India's Parliament as a member of the Praja Socialist Party.

References

Rajya Sabha members from Odisha
Praja Socialist Party politicians
1899 births
Year of death missing